Myauk Nan Kyaung Yazawin is a 17th-century Burmese chronicle commissioned by King Pye (r. 1661–1671) and written by Myauk Nan Kyaung Sayadaw, a Buddhist monk. It is an abridged history of Burmese kings to the era.

References

Bibliography
 

Burmese chronicles
Burmese Buddhist texts